Paul Wilhelm Constantin Hartmann (8 January 1889 – 30 June 1977) was a German stage and film actor.

Selected filmography 

 Zofia - Kriegs-Irrfahrten eines Kindes (1915)
  (1915)
  (1916)
  (1917)
  (1917) as Georg
 Christa Hartungen (1917) as Bernd Römer
  (1917) as Hieronymus
 Mountain Air (1917) as Egon
  (1917)
  (1918)
 Es werde Licht! (1918) as Ernst Hartwig
 Mouchy (1918)
 The Prisoner of Dahomey (1918)
 Precious Stones (1918)
 Der unheimliche Gast (1918) as Uwe Johanssen
 Taumel (1919)
 The Loves of Käthe Keller (1919)
 Die Hexe von Norderoog (1919)
 The Secret of Wera Baranska (1919)
 Blonde Poison (1919) as Georg Maudi
 The Galley Slave (1919) as Rastignac
 The Girl and the Men (1919)
 Monika Vogelsang (1920) as Amadeo Vaselli, Kirchenmaler
 Battle of the Sexes (1920)
 Mary Magdalene (1920) as Karl
 Können Gedanken töten? (1920) as Geliebter
 The Dancer Barberina (1920)
 In the Whirl of Life (1920)
 The Golden Crown (1920) as Herzog Franz Günther
 Catherine the Great (1920) as Alexander Manonow
 Humanity Unleashed (1920) as Michael Klarenbach, Chemiker
 Anna Boleyn (1920) as Sir Henry Norris
 Die Verschleierte (1920)
 Hashish, the Paradise of Hell (1921) as Der Jüngling
 Schloß Vogeloed (1921) as Graf Peter Paul Oetsch
 Impostor (1921)
 The Inheritance of Tordis (1921) as Graf von Heyst
 Die Jungfrau von Kynast (1921)
 Die Abenteuer der schönen Dorette (1921)
 The Story of Christine von Herre (1921) as Conte Marino Marco
 Die Sängerin (1921)
 Die reine Sünderin (1921)
 Madame de La Pommeraye's Intrigues (1922)
 Today's Children (1922)
 Barmaid (1922) as Günther Romberg
 Luise Millerin (1922) as Ferdinand
 Vanina (1922) as Octavio
 The False Dimitri (1922) as Peter Grigory
 Old Heidelberg (1923) as Erbprinz Karl Heinz
 Fridericus Rex - 3. Teil: Sanssouci (1923) as Friedrich Freiherr von der Trenck
 Tatjana (1923) as Fedja Gorykin
 The Slipper Hero (1923)
 The Lost Shoe (1923) as Anselm Franz
 The Evangelist (1924) as Evangelimann, Lehrer einer Klosterschule
 Chronicles of the Gray House (1925) as Junker Hinrich
 The Dice Game of Life (1925) as Hanns Freiherr v. Rhoden
 Goetz von Berlichingen of the Iron Hand (1925) as Adalbert von Weislingen
 Der Rosenkavalier (1925) as Marschall
 Our Daily Bread (1926) as Overseer
 The Family without Morals (1927) as Vinzenz
 Tingel-Tangel (1927) as Derfinger, Sekretär
 F.P.1 (1932) as Kapitänleutnant Droste
 The House of Dora Green (1933) as Frank Gebhard
 The Marathon Runner (1933) as José Barrada
 Invisible Opponent (1933) as Peter Ugron
 Grand Duchess Alexandra (1933) as Großfürst Michael
 The Tunnel (1933) as Mac Allen
  (1934) as Major Georg Ludwig Korfes
 The Legacy of Pretoria (1934) as Bernhard Fredersen
 Mazurka (1935) as Boris Kierow
 Everything for a Woman (1935) as Heinrich Droop, Besitzer einer Tankstelle
 Die klugen Frauen (1936) as Der Herzog von Olivarez
 The Castle in Flanders (1936) as Fred Winsbury
 Stronger Than Regulations (1936) as Lawyer Dr. Birk
 Port Arthur (1936) as Wossidlow
 Gräfin Volescu (1936)
 Togger (1937) as Chefredakteur Togger
 The Citadel of Warsaw (1937) as Oberst Korniloff
 The Stars Shine (1938) as himself
 Mit versiegelter Order (1938) as Ingenieur Keßler
 Revolutionshochzeit (1938) as Marc Arron
 Triad (1938) as Albert von Möller - Hauptmann a.D.
 Pour le Mérite (1938) as Rittmeister Prank
 The False Step (1939) as Major a.D. von Crampas
 Mistake of the Heart (1939) as Professor Reimers
 Legion Condor (1939) as Kommandant der Jagdflieger
 Bal paré (1940) as Dr. Horst Heisterkamp
 Bismarck (1940) as Otto von Bismarck
 Above All Else in the World (1941) as Otl. Steinhart
 Ich klage an (1941) as Professor Thomas Heyt
 Gefährtin meines Sommers (1943) as Dr. Manfred Claudius, Arzt, Jugendfreund von Angelika
 The Roedern Affair (1944) as Festungsbaumeister Dietrich von Roedern
 Gateway to Peace (1951) as Paul Dressler, ungarischer Gutsbesitzer
 The Lady in Black (1951) as Frederik Royce
 Monks, Girls and Hungarian Soldiers (1952) as Kurfürst von Bayern
 The Sergeant's Daughter (1952) as Freiherr von Lauffen
 Cuba Cabana (1952) as Gouverneur
 The Monastery's Hunter (1953) as Herr Heinrich
 Life Begins at Seventeen (1953) as Professor Lenoire
 Regina Amstetten (1954) as Pastor Fehrmann
 Conchita and the Engineer (1954) as Prof. Dahlheim
  (1954) as Count Almaviva
 Captain Wronski (1954) as Oberst Ranke
 Roses in Autumn (1955) as Mr. von Briest
 Die Barrings (1955) as Archibald von Barring
 William Tell (1956) as Werner Stauffacher
  (1957) as Friedrich Horstmann, ihr Vater
 The Fox of Paris (1957) as Col. Gen. von der Heinitz
 Rivalen der Manege (1958) as Zirkusdirektor Williams
 The Blue Moth (1959) as Lawyer Dr. Frahm
 Roses for the Prosecutor (1959) as Landgerichtspräsident Diefenbach
 The Buddenbrooks (1959) as Pastor Kölling
 Waldrausch (1962) as Der alte Stuiber
 The Longest Day (1962) as Field Marshal Gerd von Rundstedt

Bibliography

External links 

1889 births
1977 deaths
German male film actors
German male silent film actors
People from Fürth
20th-century German male actors